The Christian African Relief Trust (CART) is an independent
humanitarian agency operated by volunteers
for the specific purpose of providing individual and community development
and disaster relief. The company was founded in 1982 and is currently active in Africa and India. The non profit organization is based in Huddersfield, West Yorkshire, England.

History
Christian African Relief Trust was founded in 1982 by Guildford Tompkins.

Purpose
CART serves people without regard to their ethnic, political, or religious association. It simply helps people in need, especially those most who are vulnerable, such as women, children, and senior citizens.

CART facts
CART serves in 17 different African countries. The agency also has more than 90 percent of private donations, used for direct humanitarian services.

References

External links
CART International website

International charities
Christian charities based in the United Kingdom
Christian organizations established in the 20th century
Organisations based in Huddersfield